The Barahona amphisbaena (Amphisbaena hyporissor) is a species of worm lizard found in Hispaniola (Haiti and the Dominican Republic).

References

hyporissor
Reptiles described in 1965
Taxa named by Richard Thomas (herpetologist)
Endemic fauna of Hispaniola
Reptiles of the Dominican Republic
Reptiles of Haiti